Virginia Ruano Pascual was the defending champion, but decided to compete in Moscow at the same week.

Nicole Vaidišová won the title by defeating Virginie Razzano 5–7, 6–3, 6–2 in the final.

Seeds

Draw

Finals

Top half

Bottom half

References
 Official results archive (ITF)
 Official results archive (WTA)

2004 WTA Tour
2004 Tashkent Open